Brian Morgan (born 16 July 1968) is an English professional snooker player and coach. He is  a former World Under-21 champion, and was among the top 32 players in the professional world rankings for several years.

Career

He reached the last 16 of the 1994 World Championship. He also qualified for the tournament in 1993, 1995 and 1997. In 1996 he reached the final of the Asian Classic, beating Stephen Hendry before suffering a narrow 9–8 loss to Ronnie O'Sullivan. He made a 146 break in this tournament. In the same year he won the Benson & Hedges Championship, which entitled its winner to a wild card place in the Masters. He beat Hendry again in the 2000 Grand Prix, in which he reached the quarter-finals, and reached the last 16 of the 2004 Irish Masters.

Career finals

Ranking finals: 1

Non-ranking finals: 3 (2 titles)

Pro-am finals: 1

Amateur finals: 1 (1 title)

References

External links
Profile on World Snooker (Archive)
Profile on the Global Snooker Centre (Archive)

English snooker players
Snooker coaches, managers and promoters
Living people
1968 births